Family of the Year has released 4 full length albums, 4 EPs, and 5 singles.

Albums

Studio albums

EPs

Singles

Notes

References

Discographies of American artists